Metro Manila is divided into seventeen primary local government units (LGU) that consist of sixteen cities and one municipality. Each city and municipality is governed by an elected mayor and is divided into several villages or barangays (formerly called barrios) headed by an elected barangay captain. Barangay populations range in size from under 1,000 to over 200,000. As of the 2015 census, the total population of Metro Manila was 12,877,253.

Among all local government units in Metro Manila, only the cities of Manila, Caloocan and Pasay implement the Zone Systems. A zone is a group of barangays in a district. Although a zone is considered a subdivision in the local government units, the people do not elect a chairman for the zone in a popular election similar to the normal barangay or local elections. The zoning system is merely for strategical purposes. Additionally, these three cities use a hybrid system for its barangays - all barangays have their corresponding numbers but only a few have corresponding names. For example, the name of a barangay in the City of Manila would read as "Barangay 288 Zone 27".

As of 2015, there are 1,710 barangays in Metro Manila. These original four cities of Metro Manila (Manila, Quezon City, Caloocan, Pasay) comprise 83% (1,428 of 1,710) of all these. The high number is attributed to these areas having more people and higher density when the barangay system was initiated (note that Caloocan North is sparsely populated then and consequently was given a lower number of barangays).  The other cities merely converted old barrios to barangays. In 1975, Manila had 1,479,116 people (897 barangays), Quezon City with 956,864 (142 barangays), Caloocan with 397,201 (188 barangays) and Pasay with 254,999 (201 barangays).

Due to population growth especially in the suburbs of Manila, the number of barangays now seem disproportionate. More than half of barangays in Metro Manila are found in the City of Manila (2015 pop.: 1,780,148) with 897 barangays. Caloocan (pop.: 1,583,978) has 188 barangays and Pasay (pop.: 416,522) has 210 barangays. In comparison, Quezon City (2015 pop.: 2,936,116)the largest city both in terms of land area and populationonly has 142 barangays. The number of barangays in other local government units in Metro Manila range from 9 in Muntinlupa to 33 in Makati and Valenzuela.

In 1989, Republic Act 6714 called for a plebiscite reducing the seventy barangays constituting the first congressional district of Caloocan to only thirty barangays.

Manila has also attempted to bring down the number of barangays from 897 to 150 in 1996 through Ordinance 7907  but failed to hold a plebiscite.

This list covers all barangays sorted alphabetically with the exception of Manila, Caloocan and Pasay. Instead, district names are listed for these cities.

Number of barangays per LGU

List of barangays
In the absence of a verified ZIP code, the ZIP code of the city's central post office is provided instead.

A

B

C

D

E

F

G

H

I

J

K

L

M

N

O

P

Q

R

S

T

U

V

W

X

Y

Z

See also
 Administrative divisions of Metro Manila
 List of Metro Manila placename etymologies
 List of barangays in Marikina
 List of barangays in Quezon City
 List of barangays in Valenzuela

References

External links
Philippine Statistics Authority (PSA)

 
Barangays
Lists of barangays by location
Metro Manila